Adriano Chimento is an Italian jeweller and businessman, the founder and president of the Chimento jewellery company.

In 1946, Adriano Chimento founded Chimento in 1964 in Grisignano di Zocco, in the Italian province of Vicenza.

Adriano Chimento has been named in the Panama Papers.

References

Italian businesspeople
Italian jewellers
Living people
People named in the Panama Papers
Year of birth missing (living people)